Below is an index of pages containing lists of capital cities.

National capitals
List of national capitals
List of national capitals by latitude
List of national capitals by population
List of national capitals by area
List of capital cities by elevation
List of national capitals serving as administrative divisions
List of former national capitals
List of countries whose capital is not their largest city 
List of purpose-built national capitals
List of national capitals situated on an international border

Subnational capitals

 List of capitals outside the territories they serve
 List of purpose-built capitals of country subdivisions

Countries
 List of capitals in Australia
 List of capitals of subdivisions of Brazil
 List of capitals in China
 List of state and union territory capitals in India
 List of capitals in Japan
 List of capitals in Malaysia
 List of capitals of states of Mexico
 List of capitals in Pakistan
 List of capitals in South Korea
 List of capitals in the United States
List of capitals in Russia